Jonathan David Morris (October 8, 1804 – May 16, 1875) was an American lawyer and politician who served as a two-term U.S. Representative from Ohio from 1847 to 1851.

He was the son of Thomas Morris and brother of Isaac N. Morris.

Early life and career 
Born in Columbia, Hamilton County, Ohio Morris attended the public schools.
He studied law.
He was admitted to the bar and commenced practice in Batavia, Ohio.
He served as clerk of the courts of Clermont County.

Congress
Morris was elected as a Democrat to the Thirtieth Congress to fill the vacancy caused by the death of Thomas L. Hamer
He was reelected to the Thirty-first Congress and served from March 4, 1847, to March 3, 1851.

Death
He died in Connersville, Indiana, May 16, 1875.
He was interred in Citizens Cemetery, Batavia, Ohio.

Sources

1804 births
1875 deaths
People from Batavia, Ohio
Ohio lawyers
People from Hamilton County, Ohio
19th-century American politicians
19th-century American lawyers
Democratic Party members of the United States House of Representatives from Ohio